
Tamarind Farm Correctional Centre has accommodated over 275 male inmates on occasions.

It is operated by the Department of Correctional Services for the Ministry of National Security.

See also

List of prisons in Jamaica

External links
Aerial view.
Photos:

References

Prisons in Jamaica
Buildings and structures in Saint Catherine Parish
Spanish Town